Mikhaylovka is a rural locality (a selo) in Fyodorovsky Selsoviet of Yenotayevsky District, Astrakhan Oblast, Russia. The population was 286 as of 2010. There are 7 streets.

Geography 
Mikhaylovka is located 24 km northwest of Yenotayevka (the district's administrative centre) by road. Fyodorovka is the nearest rural locality.

References 

Rural localities in Yenotayevsky District